Henry Reville   was an American outfielder in the National Association, who played in one game for the 1874 Baltimore Canaries.

References

External links

Major League Baseball right fielders
Baseball players from Maryland
19th-century baseball players
Baltimore Canaries players
Rhode Islands players
Date of birth missing
Date of death missing